Villamil or Villaamil may refer to:

Places 
 Villamil, a hamlet in Tapia de Casariego, Spain
 Puerto Villamil, on Isabela Island in the Galapagos Islands, Ecuador
 General Villamil Playas, a town in Ecuador

Other 
 Villamil (surname), a list of people with the surname